Storm Over the Skerries (Swedish: Storm över skären) is a 1938 Swedish drama film directed by Ivar Johansson and starring Sten Lindgren, Karin Ekelund and Björn Berglund. It was shot at the Sundbyberg Studios of Europa Film in Stockholm and on location around Rödlöga and the island of Örskär. The film's sets were designed by the art director Max Linder.

Synopsis
Two local men, one of them a fisherman, quarrel over a beautiful woman who lives on their island.

Cast
 Sten Lindgren as 	Alfred Österman
 Karin Ekelund as 	Sonja Söderman
 Björn Berglund as 	Sven Vågman
 Arthur Fischer as Albert Engström
 Hjalmar Peters as 	Österberg
 Edla Rothgardt as 	Mrs. Österberg
 Tom Walter as Kalle Sjölund
 Vera Lund as 	Fia Sjölund
 Emil Fjellström as 	Vestergren
 Millan Fjellström as Mrs. Vestergren
 Harry Brandelius as 	Singing sailor 
 Albin Erlandzon as 	School teacher 
 Aurore Palmgren as 	Gossip 
 Ruth Weijden as Gossip
 Georg Skarstedt as 	Karlsson 
 Bertil Berglund as 	A Man from Roslagen
 Helge Karlsson as 	A Man from Roslagen
 John Norrman as 	A Man from Roslagen

References

Bibliography 
 Qvist, Per Olov & von Bagh, Peter. Guide to the Cinema of Sweden and Finland. Greenwood Publishing Group, 2000.

External links 
 

1938 films
Swedish drama films
1938 drama films
1930s Swedish-language films
Films directed by Ivar Johansson
Swedish black-and-white films
1930s Swedish films